The 2010 FIA European Truck Racing Championship was a multi-event motor racing championship for production based trucks held across Europe. The championship features a mix of professional motor racing teams and privately funded amateur drivers competing in highly modified versions of two-axle tractor units which conform to the technical regulations for the championship. It was the 26th European Truck Racing Championship season and began at Misano on May 23, with the finale at Jarama on October 3 after nine events. The championship was won by Antonio Albacete, taking his third title.

Teams and drivers

Race drivers without fixed number, whose number is defined race by race:

Calendar and winners

Championship standings

Drivers' Championship
Points were awarded on a 20, 15, 12, 10, 8, 6, 4, 3, 2, 1 basis to the top 10 finishers in races 1 & 3 of each meeting; and on a 10, 9, 8, 7, 6, 5, 4, 3, 2, 1 basis to the top 10 finishers in races 2 & 4 of each meeting. All scores counted towards the championship.

Teams Championship

Notes

References

External links 
 
 Truck Race Organization
 TruckRacing.de 
 Race and championship results as table sheets

European Truck Racing Championship seasons
European Truck Racing Championship
Truck Racing Championship